The Pavese (Western Lombard: Paves) is a geographical and historical area in the Pianura Padana (Po Rivers's valley) of northern Italy, located in south-western Lombardy. It constitutes one of the 3 territories in which is divided the Province of Pavia.

Geography

Overview
The territory is located in the northwestern area of the province and borders with the provinces of Milan, Lodi and Piacenza (in Emilia-Romagna). It is crossed at its southern borders by the river Po and in the east by Ticino, which separates it from the Lomellina and the Oltrepò Pavese. The territory is flat, except from some hills, and is crossed by the rivers Olona, Southern Lambro, Naviglio Pavese, Naviglio di Bereguardo and several acequias.

Municipalities
The territory is divided traditionally in the city of Pavia and the areas of Campagna Soprana (i.e. "Upper Rural Area") and Campagna Sottana (i.e. "Lower Rural Area").

City of Pavia
Pavia

Campagna Soprana
Battuda
Bereguardo
Borgarello
Bornasco
Casorate Primo
Certosa di Pavia
Giussago
Marcignago
Rognano
San Genesio ed Uniti
Torre d'Isola
Trivolzio
Trovo
Vellezzo Bellini
Zeccone
Mirabello (frazione of Pavia)

Campagna Sottana 
Albuzzano
Badia Pavese
Bascapè
Belgioioso
Ceranova
Chignolo Po
Copiano
Corteolona e Genzone
Costa de' Nobili
Cura Carpignano
Filighera 
Gerenzago
Inverno e Monteleone
Landriano
Lardirago
Linarolo
Magherno
Marzano
Miradolo Terme
Monticelli Pavese
Pieve Porto Morone
Roncaro
San Zenone al Po
Sant'Alessio con Vialone
Santa Cristina e Bissone
Siziano
Spessa
Torre d'Arese
Torre de' Negri
Torrevecchia Pia
Valle Salimbene
Vidigulfo
Villanterio
Vistarino
Zerbo
Ca' della Terra (frazione of Pavia)
Fossarmato (frazione of Pavia)

See also

Province of Pavia
Lomellina
Oltrepò Pavese

References

External links
 Province of Pavia official website

Province of Pavia
Geographical, historical and cultural regions of Italy
Geography of Lombardy